Truus Bauer (20 April 1945 – 2 November 1989) was a Dutch rower. Together with Toos van den Ende she won two European silver medals in the double sculls.

References

1946 births
1989 deaths
Dutch female rowers
Sportspeople from Voorburg
Sportspeople from Arnhem
European Rowing Championships medalists
20th-century Dutch women
20th-century Dutch people